Minerva  is the Roman goddess of wisdom, justice, law, victory, and the sponsor of arts, trade, and strategy. Minerva is not a patron of violence such as Mars, but of strategic war. From the second century BC onward, the Romans equated her with the Greek goddess Athena. Minerva is one of the three Roman deities in the Capitoline Triad, along with Jupiter and Juno.

She was the virgin goddess of music, poetry, medicine, wisdom, commerce, weaving, and the crafts. She is often depicted with her sacred creature, an owl usually named as the "owl of Minerva", which symbolised her association with wisdom and knowledge as well as, less frequently, the snake and the olive tree. Minerva is commonly depicted as tall with an athletic and muscular build, as well as wearing armour and carrying a spear. As the most important Roman goddess, she is highly revered, honored, and respected. Marcus Terentius Varro considered her to be ideal and the plan for the universe personified.

Etymology 
The name Minerva stems from Proto-Italic  ("intelligent, understanding"), and ultimately from Proto-Indo-European (PIE)  ("thought"). Helmut Rix (1981) and Gerhard Meiser (1998) have proposed the PIE derivative  ("provided with a mind, intelligent") as the transitional form.

Origin 
Following the Greek myths around Athena, she was born of Metis, who had been swallowed by Jupiter, and burst from her father's head, fully armed and clad in armour. Jupiter had sex with the titaness Metis, which resulted in her attempting to change shape (or shapeshift) to escape him. Jupiter then recalled the prophecy that his own child would overthrow him, as he had Saturn, and in turn, Saturn had Caelus.
Fearing that their child would be male, and would grow stronger than he was and rule the Heavens in his place, Jupiter swallowed Metis whole after tricking her into turning herself into a fly. The Titaness gave birth to Minerva and forged weapons and armour for her child while within Jupiter's body. In some versions of the story, Metis continued to live inside of Jupiter's mind as the source of his wisdom. Others say she was simply a vessel for the birth of Minerva. The constant pounding and ringing left Jupiter with agonizing pain. To relieve the pain, Vulcan used a hammer to split Jupiter's head and, from the cleft, Minerva emerged, whole, adult, and in full battle armour.

Presence in mythology 
Minerva is a prominent figure in Roman mythology. She appears in many famous myths. Many of the stories of her Greek counterpart Athena are attributed to Minerva in Roman mythology, such as that of the naming of Athens resulting from a competition between Minerva and Neptune, in which Minerva created the olive tree.

Minerva and Arachne 
Arachne was a mortal highly proficient in weaving and embroidery. Not only were her finished works that were beautiful, but also her process, so much so that nymphs would come out of their natural environments to watch her work. Arachne boasted that her skills could beat those of Minerva, and if she were wrong she would pay the price for it. This angered Minerva, and she took the form of an old woman to approach Arachne, offering her a chance to take back her challenge and ask forgiveness. When Arachne refused, Minerva rid herself of her disguise and took Arachne up on her challenge. Arachne began to weave a tapestry that showed the shortcomings of the gods, while Minerva depicted her competition with Neptune and the gods looking down with disgust on mortals who would dare to challenge them. Minerva's weaving was meant as a final warning to her foe to back down. Minerva was insulted by the scenes that Arachne was weaving, and destroyed it. She then touched Arachne on the forehead, which made her feel shame for what she had done, leading her to hang herself. Minerva then felt bad for the woman, and brought her back to life. However, Minerva transformed her into a spider as punishment for her actions, and hanging from a web would forever be a reminder to Arachne of her actions that offended the gods. This story also acted as a warning to mortals not to challenge the gods.

Minerva and Medusa 
Medusa was once a beautiful human, a priestess of Minerva. Later on, Minerva found out that Neptune and Medusa were kissing in a temple dedicated to Minerva herself. Because of this Minerva turned her into a monster, replacing her hair with hissing snakes and removing her charm. Medusa turned any living creature she looked upon into stone. When Perseus approached Medusa he used her reflection in his shield to avoid contact with her eyes, and then beheaded her. He delivered the severed head to Minerva, who placed its image on her Aegis.

Taming of Pegasus 
When Perseus beheaded Medusa some of the blood spilled onto the ground, and from it came Pegasus. Minerva caught the horse and tamed it before gifting the horse to the Muses. It was a kick from the hoof of Pegasus that opened the fountain Hippocrene. When Bellerophon later went to fight the Chimera he sought to use Pegasus in the fight. In order to do this he slept in Minerva's temple, and she came to him with a golden bridle. When Pegasus saw Bellerophon with the bridle the horse immediately allowed Bellerophon to mount, and they defeated the Chimera.

Turning Aglauros to stone 
Metamorphoses by Ovid tell the story of Minerva and Aglauros. When Mercury comes to seduce mortal virgin Herse, her sister Aglauros is driven by her greed to help him. Minerva discovers this and is furious with Aglauros. She seeks the assistance of Envy, who fills Aglauros with so much envy for the good fortune of others that she  turns to stone. Mercury fails to seduce Herse.

Minerva and Hercules 
Minerva assisted the hero Hercules. In Hyginus' Fabulae she is said to have helped him kill the Hydra (30.3).

Minerva and Ulysses 
Minerva assisted the hero Ulysses. Hyginus describes in his work Fabulae that Minerva changes Odysseus' appearance in order to protect and assist him multiple times (126).

Inventing the flute 
Minerva is thought to have invented the flute by piercing holes into boxwood. She enjoyed the music, but became embarrassed by how it made her face look when her cheeks puffed out to play. Because of this she threw it away and it landed on a riverbank where it was found by a satyr.

Worship in Rome and Italy

The Romans celebrated her festival from March 19 to March 23 during the day that is called, in the neuter plural, Quinquatria, the fifth day after the Ides of March, the nineteenth, an artisans' holiday. This festival was of deepest importance to artists and craftsmen as she was the patron goddess of crafting and arts. According to Ovid (Fasti 3.809) the festival was 5 days long, and the first day was said to be the anniversary of Minerva's birth, so no blood was to be shed. The following four days were full of games of "drawn swords" in honour of Minerva's military association. Suetonius tells us (Life of Domitian 4.4) that Domitian celebrated the Quinquatria by appointing a college of priests who were to stage plays and animal games in addition to poetry and oratory competitions. A lesser version, the Minusculae Quinquatria, was held on the Ides of June, June 13, by the flute-players, as Minerva was thought to have invented the flute. In 207 BC, a guild of poets and actors was formed to meet and make votive offerings at the temple of Minerva on the Aventine Hill. Among others, its members included Livius Andronicus. The Aventine sanctuary of Minerva continued to be an important center of the arts for much of the middle Roman Republic.

As Minerva Medica, she was the goddess of medicine and physicians. As Minerva Achaea, she was worshipped at Lucera in Apulia where votive gifts and arms said to be those of Diomedes were preserved in her temple.

According to the Acta Arvalia, a cow was sacrificed to Minerva on October 13 58 AD along with many other sacrifices to celebrate the anniversary of Nero coming to power. On January 3 81 AD, as a part of the New Year vows, two cows were sacrificed to Minerva (among many others) to secure the well-being of the emperor Titus, Domitian Caesar, Julia Augusta, and their children. On January 3 87 AD there is again record of a cow being sacrificed to Minerva among the many sacrifices made as a part of the New Year vows.

In Fasti III, Ovid called her the "goddess of a thousand works" due to all of the things she was associated with. Minerva was worshipped throughout Italy, and when she eventually became equated with the Greek goddess Athena, she also became a goddess of battle. Unlike Mars, god of war, she was sometimes portrayed with sword lowered, in sympathy for the recent dead, rather than raised in triumph and battle lust. In Rome her bellicose nature was emphasized less than elsewhere.

According to Livy's History of Rome (7.3), the annual nail marking the year, a process where the praetor maximus drove a nail into to formally keep track of the current year, happened in the temple of Minerva because she was thought to have invented numbers.

There is archaeological evidence to suggest that Minerva was worshipped not only in a formal civic fashion, but also by individuals on a more personal level.

Roman coinage
Minerva is featured on the coinage of different Roman emperors. She often is represented on the reverse side of a coin holding an owl and a spear among her attributes.

Worship in Britain during Roman occupation 
During the Roman occupation of Britain, it was common for carpenters to own tools ornamented with images of Minerva to invoke a greater amount of protection from the goddess of crafts. Some women would also have images of her on accessories such as hairpins or jewellery. She was even featured on some funerary art on coffins and signet rings.

Bath 
During Roman rule Minerva became equated with the Celtic goddess Sulis, to the degree where their names were used both together and interchangeably. She was believed to preside over the healing hot springs located in Bath. Though Minerva is not a water deity, her association with intellectual professions as Minerva Medica she could also be thought of as a healing goddess, the epigraphic evidence present makes it clear that this is how Minerva was thought of in Bath.

Some of the archaeological evidence present in Bath leads scholars to believe that it was thought Minerva could provide full healing from things such as rheumatism via the hot springs if she was given full credit for the healing.

The temple of Sulis Minerva was known for having a miraculous altar-fire that burned coal as opposed to the traditional wood.

Carrawburgh 
There is evidence of worship of Minerva Medica in Carrawburgh due to archaeological evidence such as a relief depicting her and Aesculapius.

Chester 
There is a shrine dedicated to Minerva in Edgar’s Field built in the face of a quarry next to the River Dee.

Etruscan Menrva

Stemming from an Italic moon goddess  ('She who measures'), the Etruscans adopted the inherited Old Latin name, thereby calling her Menrva. It is presumed that her Roman name, Minerva, is based on this Etruscan mythology. Minerva was the goddess of wisdom, war, art, schools, justice and commerce. She was the Etruscan counterpart to Greek Athena. Like Athena, Minerva burst from the head of her father, Jupiter (Greek Zeus), who had devoured her mother (Metis) in an unsuccessful attempt to prevent her birth.

By a process of folk etymology, the Romans could have linked her foreign name to the root men- in Latin words such as mens meaning "mind", perhaps because one of her aspects as goddess pertained to the intellectual. The word mens is built from the Proto-Indo-European root *men- 'mind' (linked with memory as in Greek Mnemosyne/μνημοσύνη and /μνῆστις: memory, remembrance, recollection,  in Sanskrit meaning mind).

The Etruscan Menrva was part of a holy triad with Tinia and Uni, equivalent to the Roman Capitoline Triad of Jupiter-Juno-Minerva.

Modern depictions and references of Minerva

Universities and educational establishments

As a patron goddess of wisdom, Minerva frequently features in statuary, as an image on seals, and in other forms at educational institutions. Listings of this can be found on Minerva in the emblems of educational establishments.

Societies and governments

 The Seal of California depicts the Goddess Minerva. Her birth fully-grown parallels California becoming a state without first being a territory.
 The U.S Military Medal of Honor for the Army, Navy/Marine Corps, and Coast Guard depicts Minerva in the center of it. The Air Force uses the head of the Statue of Liberty instead.  
 According to John Robison's Proofs of a Conspiracy (1798), the third degree of the Bavarian Illuminati was called Minerval or Brother of Minerva, in honor of the goddess of learning. Later, this title was adopted for the first initiation of Aleister Crowley's OTO rituals.
 Minerva Hospital for Women and Children is a first-class hospital in Chengdu, China.
 The Max Planck Society, association of research institutes mainly in Germany.
 Minerva appears in the logo of Federal University of Rio de Janeiro and other educational institutions in Brazil.

Public monuments, and places

 A statue of Minerva is the center of the Pioneer Monument in San Francisco's Civic Center created by Frank Happersberger in 1894.
 A small Roman shrine to Minerva stands in Handbridge, Chester. It sits in a public park, overlooking the River Dee.
 An imposing bronze statue of Minerva stands on the rooftop of the Círculo de Bellas Artes, Madrid, Spain.
 A statue to Minerva was designed by John Charles Felix Rossi to adorn the Town Hall of Liverpool, where it has stood since 1799. It remains extant and was restored as part of the 2014 renovations conducted by the city.
 The Minerva Roundabout in Guadalajara, Mexico, located at the crossing of the López Mateos, Vallarta, López Cotilla, Agustín Yáñez, and Golfo de Cortez avenues, features the goddess standing on a pedestal, surrounded by a large fountain, with an inscription that says "Justice, wisdom and strength guard this loyal city".
 A bronze statue of Minerva stands in Monument Square (Portland, Maine). "Our Lady of Victories Monument" dedicated in 1891, features a 14-feet-tall bronze figure by Franklin Simmons atop a granite pedestal with smaller bronze sculptures by Richard Morris Hunt.
 A sculpture of Minerva by Andy Scott, known as the Briggate Minerva, stands outside Trinity Leeds shopping centre.
 Minerva is displayed as a statue in Pavia, Italy, near the train station, and is considered as an important landmark in the city.
 Minerva is displayed as a cast bronze statue in the Minneapolis Central Library, rendered in 1889 by Jakob Fjelde.
 Minerva is displayed as a bronze statue in Frederick Ruckstull's 1920 Altar to Liberty: Minerva monument near the top of Battle Hill, the highest point of Brooklyn, New York, in Green-Wood Cemetery.
 Minerva is displayed as an 11-ft statue in Jean-Antonin Carlès's 1895 "James Gordon Bennett Memorial" in New York City's Herald Square.
 A statue of Minerva is displayed at Wells College outside of Main Building. Each year, the senior class decorates Minerva at the beginning of the fall semester. Minerva remains decorated throughout the school year; then during the morning of the last day of classes and after singing around the Sycamore tree, the senior class takes turns kissing the feet of Minerva, believed to be good luck and bring success and prosperity to all graduation seniors.
 A statue of Minerva stands atop the Ballaarat Mechanics' Institute in Ballarat, Victoria, Australia. There is also a mosaic tile of Minerva in the foyer of the building as well as a whole theatre name after her, called the 'Minerva Space'.
 A bronze statue of Minerva stands on the campus of The University of North Carolina at Greensboro, Greensboro, North Carolina. It was commissioned in 2003 by the Class of 1953 and created by sculptor James Barnhill.
 A statue of Minerva releasing an owl stands at Manderson Landing Park in Tuscaloosa, Alabama. The statue was gifted by the University of Alabama to the community in 2019 as a commemoration of the City of Tuscaloosa's bicentennial year. Minerva also features on the University of Alabama's seal.

Literature 

She is remembered in De Mulieribus Claris, a collection of biographies of historical and mythological women by the Florentine author Giovanni Boccaccio, composed in 136162. It is notable as the first collection devoted exclusively to biographies of women in Western literature. Poet Elizabeth Carter is famously portrayed in an outfit inspired by Minerva, and also wrote poems in her honour.

References

Bibliography 

 See page 1090

External links
Roman Mythology

 
Athena
Arts goddesses
Crafts goddesses
Commerce goddesses
Medicine goddesses
Roman goddesses
War goddesses
Wisdom goddesses
Virgin goddesses
Textiles in folklore
Capitoline Triad
Dii Consentes
Snake goddesses